The Rural Alliance Party (RAP) was a political party in the Solomon Islands.

History
Following the 1976 elections opposition MPs formed the Coalition Opposition Group. When this disbanded later in the year, the Rural Party was formed by David Kausimae and Faneta Sira. It was later renamed the Rural Alliance Party.

After failing to gain significant influence in Parliament, it merged with the People's Progressive Party in 1979 to form the People's Alliance Party.

References

Defunct political parties in the Solomon Islands
Political parties established in 1976
1976 establishments in the Solomon Islands
Political parties disestablished in 1979
1979 disestablishments in the Solomon Islands